Eupithecia hormiga is a moth in the  family Geometridae. It is found in Ecuador and Bolivia.

References

Moths described in 1899
hormiga
Moths of South America